The Central District of Birjand County is in South Khorasan province, Iran. At the National Census in 2006, its population was 196,834 in 52,986 households. The following census in 2011 counted 230,487 people in 63,949 households. At the latest census in 2016, the district had 261,324 inhabitants in 74,657 households.

References 

Birjand County

Districts of South Khorasan Province

Populated places in South Khorasan Province

Populated places in Birjand County